The U.S. National Vegetation Classification (NVC or USNVC) is a scheme for classifying the natural and cultural vegetation communities of the United States. The purpose of this standardized vegetation classification system is to facilitate communication between land managers, scientists, and the public when managing, researching, and protecting plant communities.

The non-profit group NatureServe maintains the NVC for the U.S. government.

See also
 British National Vegetation Classification
 Vegetation classification

External links
 The U.S. National Vegetation Classification website
 "National Vegetation Classification Standard, Version 2" FGDC-STD-005-2008, Vegetation Subcommittee, Federal Geographic Data Committee, February 2008
 U.S. Geological Survey page about the Vegetation Characterization Program
 Federal Geographic Data Committee page about the NVC

Environment of the United States
Flora of the United States
NatureServe
Biological classification